The election of the President of the Chamber of Deputies who would serve through the legislature XVIII of Italy took place on 23 and 24 March 2018, weeks after the 2022 Italian general election. Roberto Fico was elected on the fourth ballot following an agreement between the Five Star Movement and the centre-right coalition.

Procedure 
The election takes place by secret ballot. A two-thirds supermajority of the whole membership is needed to win on the first ballot. On the second and third ballot, a two-thirds supermajority of votes cast (including blank ballots among the totals) suffices. Starting from the fourth ballot, the threshold is further lowered to a simple majority of members present.

Results

First ballot

Second ballot

Third ballot

Fourth ballot

See also 
2018 President of the Italian Senate election

Notes

References 

Elections in Italy
2018 elections in Italy
President of the Italian Chamber of Deputies elections